Francis Wilson (February 7, 1854 – October 7, 1935) was an American actor.

Career

Wilson was born in Philadelphia, Pennsylvania. He began his career in a minstrel show with Haverly's United Mastodon Minstrels, but by 1878 was playing at the Chestnut Street Theatre, Philadelphia, and the next year appeared in M'liss with Annie Pixley.  After several years in regular comedy, he took up some comic opera, appearing with the McCaull Comic Opera Company and making a great success in Erminie (1886).  In 1889, leaving New York's Casino Theatre, he made his appearance as a star in The Oolah. Plays in which he starred subsequently include The Merry Monarch (1890); The Lion Tamer (1891);  The Little Corporal (1898); The Little Father of the Wilderness (1905); 'nd The Bachelor's Baby (1909), which he also wrote.  He also appeared in several productions of Rip Van Winkle. He formed his own theatre company in 1899.

He was the author of Joseph Jefferson:  Reminiscences of a Fellow Player (1906), The Eugene Field I Knew (1898), Francis Wilson's Life of Himself (1924), and John Wilkes Booth: Fact and Fiction of Lincoln's Assassination (1929), written with information from his close friend Edwin Booth.

Wilson wrote several plays, of which The Bachelor's Baby was the most successful. He was the founding president of the Actors' Equity Association.

Family
Wilson's first wife  was Mira Barrie with whom he had two daughters. Their older daughter was Frances Wilson Huard, who became a French baroness, and wrote memoirs of her life in France during World War I. After her death he married Edna Bruns (1879–1960) with whom he had a son and daughter.

Francis Wilson Playhouse
Francis Wilson Playhouse is the successor to the Clearwater Players, organized in 1930 as a community theater which presented productions in ad hoc venues around Clearwater, Florida for several years.  In 1935, the first president of Actors Equity, Francis Wilson, a winter resident in Clearwater, convinced a friend, Mary Curtis Bok (later Zimbalist,) to contribute $5,000 for the construction of a permanent home for the Clearwater Players.

Mrs. Bok agreed to the contribution on the condition that the Theater would be named after Francis Wilson, who at that time was the premier actor of the New York stage. The bronze plaque of Mary Bok over the fireplace in the lobby is the only thanks she would accept.

The City of Clearwater leased the land the theater currently sits on for a term of 99 years for the rental sum of $1.00 per year, and the theater was built in 1936.

References

Sources
Clapp and Edgett, Players of the Present (New York, 1901)
Kenrick, John. (2003) Who's Who in Musicals: Addendum 2003. Retrieved March 17, 2007.
FrancisWilsonPlayhouse.org

External links

 Francis Wilson papers, 1875-1958, held by the Billy Rose Theatre Division, New York Public Library for the Performing Arts

Male actors from Philadelphia
Male actors from New Rochelle, New York
American male stage actors
American dramatists and playwrights
American biographers
1854 births
1935 deaths
Vaudeville performers
Burials at Kensico Cemetery
Historians from New York (state)
Presidents of the Actors' Equity Association